Tankaman (also Romanized as Tankamān and Tangemān) is a city in Tankaman District, Nazarabad County, Alborz province, Iran. At the 2006 census, before it was designated a city and was then in Tehran province, its population was 4,742 in 1,226 households. At the most recent census in 2016, the city's population had decreased to 4,654 in 1,459 households.

References 

Nazarabad County

Cities in Alborz Province

Populated places in Alborz Province

Populated places in Nazarabad County